Vladas Garastas (born  February 2, 1932 in Linkuva) is a former Lithuanian professional basketball coach and the former president of the Lithuanian Basketball Federation.

Coaching career
Before retirement, he coached the Soviet Union national team, Lithuanian national team and Žalgiris Kaunas club.

1979–1989: Žalgiris Kaunas head coach
1990–1992: Prievidza head coach
1989–1991: Soviet Union national team head coach
1992–1997: Lithuanian national team head coach
1994–1996: Atletas Kaunas head coach
1996–1998: Alita Alytus head coach

Awards and achievements
With Žalgiris Kaunas club:
Won 3 USSR championship titles in 1985, 1986, 1987
Runner-up in 5 USSR championships: 1980, 1983, 1984, 1988, 1989
Won Intercontinental Cup in 1986
Won Euroleague Second place in 1986

With :
Won Bronze medals at the 1992 and 1996 Olympic Basketball Tournaments
Won Silver medal in Eurobasket 1995 final against  national team

With Soviet Union national team:
Won Bronze medal in Eurobasket 1989
Won Silver medal in 1990 FIBA World Championship

References

External links
 http://www.krepsinis.net/officials.php?user_id=71275 (in Lithuanian)

1932 births
Living people
BC Žalgiris coaches
Lithuanian basketball coaches
People from Linkuva
Soviet basketball coaches
Medalists at the 1996 Summer Olympics
Medalists at the 1992 Summer Olympics
Olympic bronze medalists for Lithuania
Soviet expatriate sportspeople in Turkey